Novaya Slobodka is a rural locality (a selo) and the administrative center of Novoslobodskoye Rural Settlement, Korochansky District, Belgorod Oblast, Russia. The population was 846 as of 2010. There are 10 streets.

Geography 
Novaya Slobodka is located 17 km west of Korocha (the district's administrative centre) by road. Merkulovka is the nearest rural locality.

References 

Rural localities in Korochansky District
Korochansky Uyezd